Richard Wynn may refer to:

Sir Richard Wynn, 2nd Baronet (1588–1649), English courtier and politician
Sir Richard Wynn, 4th Baronet (1625–1674), English MP
Dick Wynn (Richard Cross Wynn, 1892–1919), English footballer

See also 
Richard Wynne (born 1955), member of the Parliament of Victoria